Infanta Beatriz of Portugal (13 June 1430 – 30 September 1506) was a Portuguese infanta, daughter of John, Constable of Portugal (fourth son of King John I of Portugal and his wife Philippa of Lancaster), and Isabella of Barcelos, a daughter of Afonso I, Duke of Braganza.

Biography
Due to the Aviz dynasty marriage policy, Beatrice was first cousin and sister-in-law of king Afonso V of Portugal, first cousin once removed and mother-in-law of king John II of Portugal, first cousin and mother-in-law of Ferdinand II, 3rd Duke of Braganza and mother of king Manuel I of Portugal, playing an active role in politics during the consecutive reigns of Afonso V, John II and Manuel I.

Through her sister Isabella, wife of John II of Castile, she was an aunt of Isabella I of Castile, helping to settle both the Treaty of Alcáçovas and the Treaty of Terçarias de Moura between the Kingdom of Portugal and the Kingdom of Castile, after meeting with her niece Isabella in person.

She was also predominant in the Order of Santiago, acting as tutor for her son Diogo.

Infanta Beatrice protected and encouraged Gil Vicente, a Portuguese playwright, considered as the father of the Portuguese theatre.

She founded the Religiosas da Conceição monastery, in Beja, where her husband was buried.

Marriage and children
In 1447, Beatrice married her cousin Infante Ferdinand (Portuguese: Fernando), 2nd Duke of Viseu, son of King Edward of Portugal (her uncle). From this marriage, they had nine children:
 Infante João (1448–1472), 3rd Duke of Viseu, 2nd Duke of Beja, 7th Constable of Portugal;
 Infante Diogo (1450–1484), 4th Duke of Viseu, 3rd Duke of Beja;
 Infanta Eleanor of Viseu (1458–1525), married to King John II of Portugal, becoming Queen of Portugal;
 Infanta Isabella of Viseu (1459–1521), married to Ferdinand II, Duke of Braganza;
 Infante Duarte of Viseu (1462–1476 or after);
 Infante Simão of Viseu (died in 1465/1470);
 Infanta Catarina of Viseu (1465–bef.1470);
 Infante Dinis of Viseu (1468–bef.1470);
 Infante Manuel (1469–1521), 5th Duke of Viseu, 4th Duke of Beja. Became King of Portugal, as Manuel I, following his cousin's (John II) death.

Ancestry

See also
Duke of Beja
Duke of Viseu
List of Portuguese Dukedoms

References

Bibliography
”Nobreza de Portugal e do Brasil” – Vol. I, page 298 and 312. Published by Zairol Lda., Lisbon 1989.

External links
 Genealogy of Infanta Beatrice, Duchess os Viseu, in Portuguese

1430 births
1506 deaths
Portuguese infantas
House of Aviz
Duchesses of Beja
15th-century Portuguese people
16th-century Portuguese people